Rübezahl ( / a.k.a. Rübezahl, der Herr der Berge) is a 1957 West German film directed by Erich Kobler. It stars Franz Essel as the title character. The film premiered on 6 October 1957 at Planie-Lichtspiele in Stuttgart.

Plot 
Rübezahl lives in the Giant Mountains (German: Riesengebirge). For 999 years he has not appeared among the people who live in a nearby valley. When one of his dwarfs tells him that the bad people are gaining the upper hand and the good people are calling him for help, he decides to go down to the valley and teach the bad people a lesson.

Cast 
 Franz Essel – Rübezahl
 Otto Mächtlinger – Glazier Steffen
 Monika Greving – Steffen's wife
 Bobby Todd – Bäuerlein Veit
 Helmut Lieber – Fischer-Paule
 Helmo Kindermann – Cousin Klaus
 Nils Clausnitzer – Farmworker
 Paul Bös – Restaurateur
 Rolf von Nauckhoff – Guest
 Dietrich Thoms – Farmer Knoll
 Georg Lehn – Robber Krips
 Franz Keck – Robber Kraps
 Elke Arendt – Waitress
 Zita Hitz – Kitchen maid Rosa
 Bettina Braun – Anne
 Claudia Bartfeld – Lene
 Toni Mang – Karli
 Fritz Wepper – uncredited

See also 
Rübezahl's Wedding (1916)

References

External links 
 

1957 films
West German films
German children's films
Films based on fairy tales